The buff-snouted blind snake (Anilios margaretae) is a species of snake in the family Typhlopidae. The species is endemic to Australia.

Etymology
The specific name, margaretae, is in honour of Margaret Butler who was the wife of Australian naturalist Harry Butler.

Geographic range
A. margaretae is found in the Australian state of Western Australia.

Reproduction
A. margaretae is oviparous.

References

Further reading
Cogger HG (2014). Reptiles and Amphibians of Australia, Seventh Edition. Clayton, Victoria, Australia: CSIRO Publishing. xxx + 1,033 pp. . (Ramphotyphlops margaretae, p. 806).
Hedges SB, Marion AB, Lipp KM, Marin J, Vidal N (2014). "A taxonomic framework for typhlopid snakes from the Caribbean and other regions (Reptilia, Squamata)". Caribbean Herpetology (49): 1-61. (Anilios margaretae, new combination).
Storr GM (1981). "The Genus Ramphotyphlops (Serpentes: Typhlopidae) in  Western Australia". Records of the Western Australian Museum 9 (3): 235–271. (Ramphotyphlops margaretae, new species, pp. 259–260, Figure 23).
Wallach V (2006). "The Nomenclatural Status of Australian Ramphotyphlops (Serpentes: Typhlopidae)". Bulletin of the Maryland Herpetological Society 42 (1): 8-24. (Austrotyphlops margaretae, new combination, p. 13).

Anilios
Reptiles described in 1981
Snakes of Australia